{{DISPLAYTITLE:C7H8N2}}
The molecular formula C7H8N2 (molar mass: 120.15 g/mol, exact mass: 120.0687 u) may refer to:

 Benzimidazoline
 Benzamidine

Molecular formulas